General Abelardo L. Rodríguez International Airport or simply Tijuana International Airport, in Tijuana, Baja California, Mexico, is Mexico's second-northernmost airport after Mexicali International Airport. The airport is located in the city's Otay Centenario borough, immediately south of the US border. It is Latin America's 13th-busiest airport and the fourth busiest in Mexico after Mexico City, Cancun and Guadalajara airports. It handled 9,677,900 passengers in 2021, and 12,324,600 in 2021, becoming the fifth airport in the country to transport ten million passengers in a year. The airport can handle up to 10 million passengers per year and 360 flights per day.

With the opening of the Cross Border Xpress bridge and terminal on December 9, 2015, Tijuana airport can be accessed directly from the U.S.; passengers can walk across a bridge spanning the U.S.-Mexico border between a terminal on the U.S. side and the main facility on the Mexican side.

The airport serves as hub for Volaris, which is the only airline operating at both concourses. It used to be a focus city for Aero California, Aerolíneas Internacionales, Líneas Aéreas Azteca, and ALMA de Mexico. Tijuana's airport was the largest and main hub for Avolar, a low-cost airline that operated from 2005 to 2008, and the airport's second-leading airline at a time.

It is operated by Grupo Aeroportuario del Pacífico, a holding group that controls 12 international airports in central and northern Mexico. In terms of domestic destinations (totaling 34 cities), it is the best connected airport after Mexico City.

History

The Tijuana airport opened as the "Aeropuerto Federal de Tijuana" on May 1, 1951, replacing Tijuana's former airport, then located on today's Aguacaliente Boulevard. The airport's runway had an orientation of 10/28 and was 2 kilometers in length (6,500 feet) and the first terminal was built on the southwest part of the airport, facing the current terminal built in 1970. The airport was named after General Abelardo L. Rodríguez, Governor of Baja California, and late President of Mexico.

In 1954, Mexicana de Aviacion began direct Tijuana-Mexico City flights. The airport was incorporated to ASA in 1965. Under President Gustavo Diaz Ordaz, a National Plan of Airports was initiated and headed by Gilberto Valenzuela Ezquerro, Secretary of Public Works (Secretario de Obras Publicas). As more people arrived and settled in Tijuana in the 1960s, demand for flights increased.

Runway and facilities 
At the inauguration of the Amistad Dam between Texas and Mexico in 1969, President Richard Nixon notified President Gustavo Díaz Ordaz of his intent to initiate Operation Intercept to stem the flow of narcotics between the U.S. and Mexico. As political pressure rose between Washington and Mexico City, to minimize incursion into U.S. airspace, Gilberto Valenzuela Ezquerro, Secretary of Public Works and in charge of the Tijuana airport's expansion, re-oriented the runway from 10/28 to 09/27. The change in orientation impacted Tijuana's approach over Cerro San Isidro, a 2,600 foot (800 meter) land obstacle that increased the east approach glide slope above 3 degrees and prevented a full Instrument Landing System (ILS approach) on the 27 runway required during foul weather landings. Due to prevailing winds, the 27 runway is Tijuana's main approach pattern.

The construction of the new terminal and a 2.5 kilometer 09-27 runway to accommodate larger aircraft was finished in July 1970 and inaugurated on November 19, 1970, by then-President Gustavo Diaz Ordaz and Gilberto Valenzuela Ezquerro, Secretary of Public Works. The total cost for the improvements in 1970 was $108,487,000 Pesos ($8,678,960 U.S. dollars). The original terminal was then assigned as an air base for the Mexican Armed Forces, and it is now known as the aeropuerto viejo, or old airport. The terminal, however, is seldom referred as Terminal 1, with Main Terminal being referred as Terminal 2.

In 1983, Tijuana became Mexico's fastest growing city, to meet increased airport demand; both terminal and parking areas were expanded. In 1987, air traffic suffered a sharp decline due to the suspension of service by Aeromexico. With the restructuring of Aeromexico in 1988, service and air traffic increased causing delays in service. Terminal space and parking for passengers became inadequate. To meet airport demand, Mexico issued its first two 10 year private sector airport "co-investments" to expand both the departure lounges and parking areas. Construction of both were completed in 1991

Privatization
Mexico's airport privatization program was initiated on December 22, 1995, when the Secretariat of Communications and Transportation (Secretaria de Comunicaciones y Transporte) published the "Ley de Aeropuertos" (Airport Law). The Tijuana airport became part of the Pacific Airport Group (Grupo Aeroportuario del Pacífico) consisting of 12 airports and headquartered in Guadalajara. In 1999, a consortium consisting of the Spanish investors Unión Fenosa, Dragados, and Aeropuertos Españoles y Navegación Aérea (AENA), together with the Mexican strategic investor Grupo Empresarial Ángeles, collectively known as Aeropuertos Mexicanos del Pacifico, S.A. de C.V. (AMP), won the Pacific 12 airport package.

Expansion
As part of the airport privatization concession, the airport terminal was expanded and renovated in 2002, when the extension of concourse A and B was built, allowing the terminal to double its capacity. Several taxiways were also expanded to allow the operations of larger aircraft such as the Boeing 747. Nevertheless, as the airport has become one of the most important hubs and gateways in the country, there is a plan of a new terminal, which could house the operations of the major airline at the airport: Aeroméxico (including Aeroméxico Connect). As of today, both of the concourses have been expanded and remodeled, including the progressive introduction of glass-jetways replacing the old ones.
From 2011 to 2012, the airport's Terminal 1 underwent major renovations in Concourse A and B, including new customs and international arrivals facilities, construction of a new bus terminal, and other exterior renovations. In December 2015 the Cross Border Xpress (CBX) cross-border bridge and passenger terminal on the U.S. side opened.

In 2022, a new terminal building, named the "Nuevo Edificio Procesador" (New Processing Building), has opened. It consist of additional check-in counters, security lanes, boarding gates, and immigration facilities. The new terminal will allow for international flights, with targeted flight service to Asia and South America. It also allows direct access to the United States from international arrivals via Cross Border Xpress, an increased width for air bridges, a new waiting room, and an expanded arrivals and documentation hall for international flights. In addition, there are plans for a hotel, an office facility, and a bus terminal. Construction lasted from 2018 to 2022.

International service
From 2006 until September 2014, Aeroméxico operated three weekly flights to Tokyo-Narita, but in September 2014 they stopped in Monterrey instead.
Aeroméxico resumed services to Shanghai on March 26, 2010, after the airline halted service 11 months earlier due to the 2009 flu pandemic. The airline temporarily suspended service to Shanghai again from September 4, 2011, to January 10, 2012. In 2019, the cancellation of the Mexico City-Tijuana-Shanghai route was announced, making Hainan's service to Beijing the only remaining international flight from the airport. International service ended in early 2020 (due to COVID-19 pandemic) after Hainan announced the cessation of all flights to Mexico.

Cross Border Xpress ("CBX", Terminal 2)

Cross Border Xpress, or CBX, is the world's third cross-border passenger terminal (after Geneva and Basel-Mulhouse). It consists of a terminal on the U.S. side of the border and a bridge to connect the Tijuana Airport with that terminal, and opened on December 9, 2015.

The project consists of a second terminal, located on U.S. soil adjacent to the border, and an international bridge. This building serves as a check-in and processing facility for departing passengers only, with no gates or arrival facilities (thus functionally resembling Hong Kong International Airport Terminal 2), but with its own parking and customs offices, that links passengers to gates at Terminal 1 via a 390-foot bridge across the border. The structural scheme allows greater access to flights out of Tijuana Airport for both domestic and international air carriers.

The project had an initial estimated cost of $78 million US and a final completion cost of $120 million US, funded by Mexican and U.S. private investors and Grupo Aeroportuario del Pacífico. Building E of Tijuana's Terminal 1 underwent restructuring, to support the new bridge own structure on Mexican soil. The initial design was the work of Ralph Nieders who first introduced the concept of a cross-border passenger terminal in Mexico City to Mexicana de Aviación in 1989, to the San Diego Association of Governments in 1990 and in 2002, to the Bush-Fox Presidential Commission, Partnership for Prosperity, in Washington D.C. The design of the joint binational Terminal 2 building is the work of late Mexican architect Ricardo Legorreta.

Location

Runway 09/27 runs east–west approximately 300 meters south of the U.S.-Mexico border. The approach to the runway is either from the east (normally) or from the west (when Santa Ana wind conditions exist).

Brown Field Municipal Airport (SDM/KSDM) in San Diego, California lies just over one nautical mile (about 2 km) north of TIJ, with a similar runway length and orientation. SDM is a general aviation field not set up for scheduled passenger service. Both SDM and TIJ are designated ports of entry for their respective countries.

Facilities
The airport consists of a single runway, a parallel taxiway, and a 23 gate main terminal with two concourses, a food court and a high-tech control tower, one of the tallest in Mexico. At the opposite side of the Main Terminal building there is another terminal and runway, the Old Airport Terminal, which houses military aviation, mostly performed by the Mexican Armed Forces; south of the adjacent runway (closed for commercial operations), there are 4 remote positions, mostly used by cargo airliners, linked by a shorter taxiway to the main runway. The airport is also used to a lesser extent for general aviation, housed at the General Aviation Building (GAB Terminal).

Main Terminal:

 Number of gates: 23
 Contact positions: 12
 Remote positions: 4
 Number of jetways: 10
 Lounges:
 VIP Room Tijuana (Main Terminal - Upper Level)
 Food court (Concourses A, B (airside), Main Corridor (landside))
 Customs & Immigration (International Arrivals are handled at Concourse B, departures at Concourse A)
 Passport & Nationality Control (Domestic arrivals)
 Taxi & car rentals (Arrivals & Departures area)
 Bus Terminal (East of Main Terminal)
 Duty Free (Main corridor, Concourses A, B)
 Parking area (Building E)

New Processing Building:
 Number of gates: 2
 Security screening lanes: 6
 Check-in counters: 52
 Immigration booths: 6

GAB Terminal:
 General aviation apron
VIP room
 Pilots lounge
 Passengers lounge

Old Airport Terminal
 Apron
 Contact positions: 2
 Remote positions: 4
 Helipads: 3
 Parking area

Cross Border Xpress ("CBX", Terminal 2):
 VIP room
 U.S. Customs and Border Protection
 Sports bar
 Coffee shop and sit-down restaurant
 Duty-free shop
 Taxi & car rental
 Parking

Airlines and destinations

Destinations map

Passenger

Cargo

Old airport terminal

The Old Airport Terminal (known for locals as Aeropuerto Viejo, old airport) is set for aviation of the Mexican Military and federal police forces. This military airbase belongs to the Northwestern Region of the Mexican Air Force. One cargo airline operates at the terminal.

 Mexican military
 Mexican Army
 Mexican Air Force
 Agencies of the Attorney General Office of the Republic
 Federal police
 Federal Investigations Agency

Incoming flights of these armed forces agencies usually arrive from the Mexican Air Force Central Region, mostly from Mexico City International Airport or nearby airbases.

GAB Terminal
Note: The General Aviation Building (GAB Terminal) is used for general/non-commercial aviation or private jets. The General Aviation Building is designed to receive up to 120 persons per hour and it has all the services for the convenience of passengers during their private flights. It has a surface of 420 m2 (4,700 sq. ft.), where there are government offices, administrative offices, a pilots lounge, and passenger lounge. 
Two aviation schools are based at this terminal, along with one cargo airline operating there.
Centro Aeronáutico de Tijuana

Statistics

Passengers

Busiest routes

Ground transportation

Bus
The airport may be reached from Downtown Tijuana or Zona Rio by local bus. It costs $11.00 MXN (US$0.60).

Shuttle
Volaris provides a shuttle service from San Diego, California, United States to General Abelardo L. Rodríguez International Airport to allow San Diego residents make connections within Mexico.  You cannot board this shuttle at San Diego International Airport, but instead take a local bus from the Airport to the Amtrak Station, 1050 Kettner Blvd. on the corner of Broadway Ave, Downtown San Diego, CA 92101. There is no equivalent shuttle from TIJ airport back to downtown San Diego as most people who connect between Tijuana Airport and San Diego pay to use the Cross Border Xpress, and then take private vehicles or Uber or taxis as there is no public transportation from CBX.

Taxi
Due to a prohibition by Mexican law, Mexican cities' public taxis may drop passengers at the airport, but cannot pick up passengers from the terminal. The airport thus offers transportation for passengers from the terminal to any point of the city on the SAAT Taxis (Servicio Aeroportuario de Autotransporte Terrestre, Spanish for Terrestrial Transport Airport Service, an airport government-leased taxi company). This and other authorized taxi carriers may be reached at the arrivals hall. This inflates taxi prices, forcing passengers to either pay them or walk outside the airport.

Gallery

See also 

 List of the busiest airports in Mexico
 Transportation in Tijuana
 San Diego International Airport

References

External links

 Tijuana International Airport
 Current weather at MMTJ from NOAA
 Grupo Aeroportuario del Pacífico - Company that operates the airport.
 General Abelardo L. Rodríguez International Airport at Google Maps
 Off-Airport Parking and Ground Transportation

Tijuana Airport
Airports in Baja California
Airport
Mexico–United States border crossings
1951 establishments in Mexico
Airports established in 1951